Elections to Castlereagh Borough Council were held on 5 May 2011 on the same day as the other Northern Irish local government elections. The election used four district electoral areas to elect a total of 23 councillors.

Election results

Note: "Votes" are the first preference votes.

Districts summary

|- class="unsortable" align="centre"
!rowspan=2 align="left"|Ward
! % 
!Cllrs
! % 
!Cllrs
! %
!Cllrs
! %
!Cllrs
! % 
!Cllrs
! %
!Cllrs
!rowspan=2|TotalCllrs
|- class="unsortable" align="center"
!colspan=2 bgcolor="" | DUP
!colspan=2 bgcolor="" | Alliance
!colspan=2 bgcolor="" | UUP
!colspan=2 bgcolor="" | SDLP
!colspan=2 bgcolor="" | Green
!colspan=2 bgcolor="white"| Others
|-
|align="left"|Castlereagh Central
|bgcolor="#D46A4C"|41.4
|bgcolor="#D46A4C"|3
|28.8
|2
|12.9
|1
|5.7
|0
|0.0
|0
|11.2
|0
|6
|-
|align="left"|Castlereagh East
|bgcolor="#D46A4C"|56.0
|bgcolor="#D46A4C"|4
|26.3
|2
|5.6
|1
|0.0
|0
|7.7
|1
|4.4
|0
|7
|-
|align="left"|Castlereagh South
|bgcolor="#D46A4C"|36.5
|bgcolor="#D46A4C"|2
|19.6
|1
|12.0
|1
|22.6
|0
|0.0
|0
|9.3
|0
|5
|-
|align="left"|Castlereagh West
|bgcolor="#D46A4C"|32.7
|bgcolor="#D46A4C"|2
|27.0
|1
|16.1
|1
|17.3
|1
|0.0
|0
|6.9
|0
|5
|- class="unsortable" class="sortbottom" style="background:#C9C9C9"
|align="left"| Total
|42.6
|11
|25.2
|6
|11.2
|3
|11.0
|2
|2.9
|1
|7.1
|0
|23
|-
|}

Districts results

Castlereagh Central

2005: 4 x DUP, 1 x Alliance, 1 x UUP
2011: 3 x DUP, 2 x Alliance, 1 x UUP
2005-2011 Change: Alliance gain from DUP

Castlereagh East

2005: 5 x DUP, 1 x Alliance, 1 x UUP
2011: 4 x DUP, 2 x Alliance, 1 x Green
2005-2011 Change: Alliance and Green gain from DUP and UUP

Castlereagh South

2005: 2 x DUP, 1 x SDLP, 1 x Alliance, 1 x UUP
2011: 2 x DUP, 1 x SDLP, 1 x Alliance, 1 x UUP
2005-2011 Change: No change

Castlereagh West

2005: 2 x DUP, 1 x Alliance, 1 x SDLP, 1 x UUP
2011: 2 x DUP, 1 x Alliance, 1 x SDLP, 1 x UUP
2005-2011 Change: No change

References

Castlereagh Borough Council elections
Castlereagh